The 2013 AFF U-16 Youth Championship is the 9th edition of the AFF U-16 Youth Championship, organised by the ASEAN Football Federation for the men's under-16 national teams of Southeast Asia. It will be hosted by Myanmar. It will be played between 20 August to 2 September 2013. A total of 10 teams will play in the tournament.

Malaysia beat Indonesia 3–2 through penalty shoot-out in the final for their first title in the championship.

Participant teams
All eleven member associations of the ASEAN Football Federation were set to take part in the tournament but Thailand and Timor-Leste withdrew. Australia was invited by the AFF, they were omitted and the AFF reverted to two groups featuring five teams.

Venues

Group stage
The official draw was made on the twenty-seventh of February 2013. Thailand and Timor-Leste withdrew. Australia was invited by the AFF. The group stage consisted of 2 groups of 5 teams with the top 2 of each group qualifying for the semi-finals.

Group A

Group B

Knockout stage

Bracket

Semi-finals

Third place play-off

Final

Winner

Goalscorers
6 goals
 Cameron Joice
 Bach Hong Han

5 goals
 Jackson Bandiera

4 goals

 Gian Mendez
 Kosta Petratos
 Chhuot Senteang
 Gatot Wahyudi
 Nguyen Van Huy

3 goals

 Daniel Maskin
 Riley McGree
 Sinthanong Phanvongsa
 M. Kogilaswaran
 Muhammad Najmuddin Samat
 Muhammad Zulqarnaen Suzliman
 Hoang The Thai
 Nguyen Doan Trung Nhan

2 goals

 Jamie Dimitroff
 Kunthea Ravan

 Riyanto
 Dinesh Rajasingam
 Muhamad Shahrul Akmal
 Muhammad Syukri Mohd Bashir

1 goal

 Caio de Godoy
 Christian Verbi
 Jamal Reiners
 Long Phearat
 Ouk Sovann
 Dimas Ahmad
 Habel Siegers
 Habib Arif Fadhilla
 Reksa Maulana
 Laithaya Sisongkham
 Somxay Keohanam
 Abang Nur-firman Abang Norazman
 Ahmad Firdaus Ismail
 Muhammad Hafiy Haikal
 Muhammad Shahrul Adnan
 Min Thu
 Oakkar Bo
 Sa Aung Pyea Ko
 Ye Yint Aung
 Ye Yint Ko
 Jeremiah Borlongan
 Ameer Hakeen
 Bùi Tiến Dụng
 Dang Van Danh
 Le Tien Anh
 Nguyen Huu Tuan
 Pham Trong Hoa

1 own goal

 Mohammad Syakirin Misli (playing against Cambodia)
 Muhammad Yuzlin Ishak (playing against Myanmar)
 Suon Nquet (playing against Myanmar)

References

2013 in AFF football
AFF U-16 Youth Championship
AFF U16
2013
2013 in youth association football